is a Peruvian professional footballer currently playing as a forward for J1 League side Albirex Niigata as a designated special player.

Career statistics

Club
.

Notes

Honours
 Albirex Niigata
 J2 League: 2022

References

External links

1999 births
Living people
Footballers from Lima
Peruvian people of Japanese descent
Peruvian footballers
Japanese footballers
Association football forwards
J2 League players
Urawa Red Diamonds players
Albirex Niigata players